The 1934–35 IHL season was the sixth season of the International Hockey League, a minor professional ice hockey league in the Midwestern and Eastern United States and Canada. Six teams participated in the league, and the Detroit Olympics won the championship.

Regular season

Playoffs

Semifinals
Best of 3

Detroit Olympics beat Syracuse Stars 2 wins to none,

London Tecumsehs beat Cleveland Falcons 2 wins to none.

Final
Best of 5

Detroit Olympics beat London Tecumsehs 3 wins to none and won the league championship.

External links
Season on hockeydb.com

1934 in ice hockey
1935 in ice hockey